In mathematics, the sieve of Pritchard is an algorithm for finding all prime numbers up to a specified bound.
Like the ancient sieve of Eratosthenes, it has a simple conceptual basis in number theory.
It is especially suited to quick hand computation for small bounds.

Whereas the sieve of Eratosthenes marks off each non-prime for each of its prime factors, the sieve of Pritchard avoids considering almost all non-prime numbers by building progressively larger wheels, which represent the pattern of numbers not divisible by any of the primes processed thus far.
It thereby achieves a better asymptotic complexity, and was the first sieve with a running time sublinear in the specified bound.
Its asymptotic running-time has not been improved on, and it deletes fewer composites than any other known sieve.
It was created in 1979 by Paul Pritchard.

Since Pritchard has created a number of other sieve algorithms for finding prime numbers, the sieve of Pritchard is sometimes singled out by being called the wheel sieve (by Pritchard himself) or the dynamic wheel sieve.

Overview
A prime number is a natural number that has no natural number divisors other than the number  and itself.

To find all the prime numbers less than or equal to a given integer , a sieve algorithm examines a set of candidates in the range ,
and eliminates those that are not prime, leaving the primes at the end.
The sieve of Eratosthenes examines all of the range, first removing all multiples of the first prime , then of the next prime , and so on.
The sieve of Pritchard instead examines a subset of the range consisting of numbers that occur on successive wheels,
which represent the pattern of numbers left after each successive prime is processed by the sieve of Eratosthenes.

For  the 'th wheel  represents this pattern.
This is because adding  to a number doesn't change whether or not it is divisible by one of the first  prime numbers,
since the remainder on division by any one of these primes is unchanged.

So  with length  represents the pattern of odd numbers;
Wheels are so-called because  can be usefully visualized as a circle of circumference  with its members marked at their corresponding distances from an origin.
Then rolling the wheel along the number line marks points corresponding to successive numbers not divisible by one of the first  prime numbers.
The animation shows  being rolled up to 30.

Then the animation generates .

The sieve of Pritchard is derived from the observation that this holds generally:
So the sieve of Pritchard starts with the trivial wheel  and builds successive wheels until the square of the wheel's first member after  is at least .

It remains to find a method for generating the next wheel.
This also holds generally: for all , .
The sieve of Pritchard as originally presented does so by first skipping past successive members until finding the maximum one needed, and then doing the deletions in reverse order by working back through the set.
This is the method used in the first animation above.
Another approach is given by Gries and Misra.

The algorithm, for finding all primes up to N, is therefore as follows:

 Start with a set W={1} and length=1 representing wheel 0, and prime p=2.
 As long as p2 <= N, do the following
 if length < N then
 extend W by repeatedly getting successive members w of W starting with 1 and inserting length+w into W as long as it doesn't exceed p*length or N;
 increase length to the minimum of p*length and N.
 repeatedly delete p times each member of W by first finding the largest <= length and then working backwards.
 note the prime p, then set p to the next member of W after 1 (or 3 if p was 2).
 if length < N then extend W to N by repeatedly getting successive members w of W starting with 1 and inserting length+w into W as long as it doesn't exceed N;
 On termination, the rest of the primes up to N are the members of W after 1.

Example

To find all the prime numbers less than or equal to 150, proceed as follows.

Start with wheel 0 with length 1, representing all natural numbers 1, 2, 3...:

   1

The first number after 1 for wheel 0 (when rolled) is 2; note it as a prime.
Now form wheel 1 with length 2x1=2 by first extending wheel 0 up to 2 and then deleting 2 times each number in wheel 0, to get:

   1 

The first number after 1 for wheel 1 (when rolled) is 3; note it as a prime.
Now form wheel 2 with length 3x2=6 by first extending wheel 1 up to 6 and then deleting 3 times each number in wheel 1, to get

   1   5

The first number after 1 for wheel 2 is 5; note it as a prime.
Now form wheel 3 with length 5x6=30 by first extending wheel 2 up to 30 and then deleting 5 times each number in wheel 2 (in reverse order!), to get

   1    7 11 13 17 19 23  29

The first number after 1 for wheel 3 is 7; note it as a prime.
Now wheel 4 has length 7x30=210, so we only extend wheel 3 up to our limit 150.
(No further extending will be done now that the limit has been reached.)
We then delete 7 times each number in wheel 3 until we exceed our limit 150, to get the elements in wheel 4 up to 150:

   1     11 13 17 19 23  29 31 37 41 43 47  53 59 61 67 71 73  79 83 89  97 101 103 107 109 113  121 127 131  137 139 143 149

The first number after 1 for this partial wheel 4 is 11; note it as a prime.
Since we've finished with rolling, we delete 11 times each number in the partial wheel 4 until we exceed our limit 150, to get the elements in wheel 5 up to 150:

   1      13 17 19 23  29 31 37 41 43 47  53 59 61 67 71 73  79 83 89  97 101 103 107 109 113   127 131  137 139  149

The first number after 1 for this partial wheel 5 is 13.
Since 13 squared is at least our limit 150, we stop.
The remaining numbers (other than 1) are the rest of the primes up to our limit 150.

Just 8 composite numbers are removed, once each.
The rest of the numbers considered (other than 1) are prime.
In comparison, the natural version of Eratosthenes sieve (stopping at the same point) removes composite numbers 184 times.

Pseudocode

The sieve of Pritchard can be expressed in pseudocode, as follows:

 algorithm Sieve of Pritchard is
     input: an integer N >= 2.
     output: the set of prime numbers in {1,2,...,N}.
 
     let W and Pr be sets of integer values, and all other variables integer values.
     k, W, length, p, Pr := 1, {1}, 2, 3, {2};
     {invariant: p = pk+1 and W = Wk  {1,2,...,N} and length = minimum of Pk,N and Pr = the primes up to pk}
     while p2 <= N do
         if (length < N) then
             Extend W,length to minimum of p*length,N; 
         Delete multiples of p from W; 
         Insert p into Pr; 
         k, p := k+1, next(W, 1) 
     if (length < N) then
         Extend W,length to N;
 
     return Pr  W - {1};

where next(W, w) is the next value in the ordered set W after w.
 procedure Extend W,length to n is
     {in: W = Wk and length = Pk and n > length}
     {out: W = Wkn and length = n}
 
     integer w, x;
     w, x := 1, length+1;
     while x <= n do
         Insert x into W;
         w := next(W,w);
         x := length + w;
     length := n;
	 
 procedure Delete multiples of p from W,length is
     integer w;
     w := p;
     while p*w <= length do
         w := next(W,w);
     while w > 1 do
         w := prev(W,w);
         Remove p*w from W;
where prev(W, w) is the previous value in the ordered set W before w.
when k = 0.

This abstract algorithm uses ordered sets supporting the operations of insertion of a value greater than the maximum, deletion of a member, getting the next value after a member, and getting the previous value before a member.
Using one of Mertens' theorems (the third) it can be shown to use  of these operations and additions and multiplications.

Implementation

An array-based doubly-linked list s can be used to implement the ordered set W, with s[w] storing next(W,w) and s[w-1] storing prev(W,w).
This permits each abstract operation to be implemented in a small number of operations.
(The array can also be used to store the set Pr "for free".)
Pritchard also shows how multiplications can be eliminated by using very small multiplication tables, so the bit complexity is  bit operations.

In the same model, the space complexity is  words, i.e.,  bits.
The sieve of Eratosthenes requires only 1 bit for each candidate in the range 2 through , so its space complexity is lower at  bits.
Note that space needed for the primes is not counted, since they can printed or written to external storage as they are found.
Pritchard presented a variant of his sieve that requires only  bits without compromising the sublinear time complexity,
making it asymptotically superior to the natural version of the sieve of Eratostheses in both time and space.

However, the sieve of Eratostheses can be optimized to require much less memory by operating on successive segments of the natural numbers. Its space complexity can be reduced to  bits without increasing its time complexity
This means that in practice it can be used for much larger limits  than would otherwise fit in memory, and also take advantage of fast cache memory.
For maximum speed it is also optimized using a small wheel to avoid sieving with the first few primes (although this does not change its asymptotic time complexity).
Therefore the sieve of Pritchard is not competitive as a practical sieve over sufficiently large ranges.

Geometric model

At the heart of the sieve of Pritchard is an algorithm for building successive wheels.
It has a simple geometric model as follows:

 Start with a circle of circumference 1 with a mark at 1
 To generate the next wheel:
 Go around the wheel and find (the distance to) the first mark after 1; call it p
 Create a new circle with p times the circumference of the current wheel
 Roll the current wheel around the new circle, marking it where a mark touches it
 Magnify the current wheel by p and remove the marks that coincide

Note that for the first 2 iterations it is necessary to continue round the circle until 1 is reached again.

The first circle represents , and successive circles represent wheels .

It is apparent from the model that wheels are symmetric.
This is because  is not divisible by one of the first  primes if and only if  is not so divisible.
It is possible to exploit this to avoid processing some composites, but at the cost of a more complex algorithm.

Related sieves

Once the wheel in the sieve of Pritchard reaches its maximum size, the remaining operations are equivalent to those performed by Euler's sieve.

The sieve of Pritchard is unique in conflating the set of prime candidates with a dynamic wheel used to speed up the sifting process.
But a separate static wheel (as frequently used to speed up the sieve of Eratosthenes) can give an  speedup to the latter, or to linear sieves, provided it is large enough (as a function of ).
Examples are the use of the largest wheel of length not exceeding  to get a version of the sieve of Eratosthenes that takes  additions and requires only  bits, and the speedup of the naturally linear sieve of Atkin to get a sublinear optimized version.

Bengalloun found a linear smoothly incremental sieve, i.e., one that (in theory) can run indefinitely and takes a bounded number of operations to increment the current bound .
He also showed how to make it sublinear by adapting the sieve of Pritchard to incrementally build the next dynamic wheel while the current one is being used.
Pritchard showed how to avoid multiplications, thereby obtaining the same asymptotic bit-complexity as the sieve of Pritchard.

Runciman provides a functional algorithm inspired by the sieve of Pritchard.

See also
 Sieve of Eratosthenes
 Sieve of Atkin
 Sieve theory

References

Primality tests
Articles with example pseudocode
Sieve theory
Algorithms